The Cedarhurst Cut-off was a rail line owned and operated by the Long Island Rail Road in the U.S. state of New York. The line split from the LIRR's Main Line at Rockaway Junction (near Hollis) and ran south via Springfield Gardens and Cedarhurst and on to Far Rockaway. The part north of the crossing of the old Southern Railroad of Long Island at Springfield Junction is now part of the Montauk Branch, while the rest has been abandoned in favor of the ex-Southern Far Rockaway Branch.

History
The New York and Rockaway Railroad was incorporated December 30, 1871 to build from the LIRR Main Line east of Jamaica south to Rockaway in competition with the South Side Railroad's Far Rockaway Branch. In exchange for completing it, the LIRR agreed to lease the line on March 2, 1871. It opened from the Main Line south to Springfield Gardens on June 21, 1871, and to Mott Avenue in Far Rockaway on May 14, 1872.

After the LIRR and South Side were brought under common ownership in 1876, the line was abandoned from Springfield Junction south to Cedarhurst on June 2. The portion north of Springfield Junction was connected to the old South Side main line, and is still the main Montauk Branch line.

The line between Springfield Junction and Cedarhurst has been rebuilt and abandoned twice, with electrification, first between 1905 and 1908 to help relieve the traffic off the Far Rockaway Branch; however, for unknown reasons the branch was never put into revenue service and instead was used to route equipment. In 1918 the rail was torn up and used for World War I, however, in 1928 the LIRR, in an effort to protect their right of way with the anticipation of new street and residential development in the Southeastern areas of Queens, relayed the track with third rail. However, with service to the Rockaways sufficiently served by the Far Rockaway Branch, the cut-off was deemed redundant and torn up for good in 1934. Ironically the new street grid being laid down in the area was designed around the cut-off leading to an unusual street pattern in the Rosedale section of Queens in the area of the now vanished cut-off. The line currently passes through marshland within Brookville Park. A right of way is preserved along the northern boundary of North Woodmere Park, with no development taking place where the rail line once was.

The New York and Rockaway Railroad was sold at foreclosure on May 27, 1903 and reorganized as the Jamaica and South Shore Railroad on October 18. The Jamaica and South Shore was merged into the LIRR on December 6, 1912.

Stations

Besides the existing and former stations along the current Montauk Branch, stations along the line included the following;

References

Long Island Rail Road branches
Transportation in Nassau County, New York
Railway lines opened in 1871
1934 disestablishments in New York (state)
Railroad cutoffs
Railway lines closed in 1934
1871 establishments in New York (state)